Tlačnica (in older sources Tlačensa) is a former settlement in the Municipality of Moravče in central Slovenia. It is now part of the village of Peče. The area is part of the traditional region of Upper Carniola. The municipality is now included in the Central Slovenia Statistical Region.

Geography
Tlačnica lies north of the village center of Peče, on a side road from Zgornje Koseze. It is located on the southeastern slope of Big Peak Hill.

History
Tlačnica had a population of 24 living in four houses in 1880, and 34 living in five houses in 1900. During the Second World War, a Partisan checkpoint operated at the Gašpere farm in Tlačnica. Tlačnica was annexed by Peče in 1952, ending its existence as an independent settlement.

References

External links
Tlačnica on Geopedia

Populated places in the Municipality of Moravče
Former settlements in Slovenia